Andrei Igorevich Svechnikov (born 26 March 2000) is a Russian professional ice hockey winger for the Carolina Hurricanes of the National Hockey League (NHL). The Hurricanes selected him second overall in the 2018 NHL Entry Draft.

Playing career
Svechnikov began his junior career in North America with the Muskegon Lumberjacks of the United States Hockey League (USHL). He signed a tender with the Lumberjacks in May 2016, due in part to proximity to his brother's American Hockey League (AHL) team in Grand Rapids, Michigan. In the 2016–17 season, he led the team in scoring and finished sixth overall in the league. Svechnikov was named to the All-USHL Team and declared USHL Rookie of the Year.

Svechnikov was selected first overall in the 2017 Canadian Hockey League (CHL) Import Draft by the Ontario Hockey League's (OHL) Barrie Colts. During his first season with the club, he recorded 40 goals and 32 assist for 72 points in 44 games. He was rewarded the Emms Family Award as rookie of the year. At the end of the season, he was the top-ranked North American skater by the NHL Central Scouting Bureau for the upcoming NHL Entry Draft.

At the draft, the Carolina Hurricanes selected Svechnikov second overall. On 30 June, he signed a three-year, entry-level contract with the team.

Svechnikov made his NHL debut on 4 October 2018, going scoreless in a 2–1 loss to the New York Islanders. One day later, he recorded his first career NHL point (an assist) in a 3–1 win over the Columbus Blue Jackets. On 7 October, Svechnikov scored his first career NHL goal during an 8–5 win against the New York Rangers. In doing so, he became the first player born in the 2000s to score an NHL goal. Svechnikov finished his rookie season with 20 goals and 17 assists for 37 points. He also recorded 5 points in 9 postseason games.

On 29 October 2019, Svechnikov become the first NHL player to score a Michigan goal, doing so against David Rittich in a 2–1 win over the Calgary Flames. He scored a similar goal on 17 December against the Winnipeg Jets. He greatly improved on his previous season, scoring 24 goals and 37 assists for 61 points. The Hurricanes matched up with the Rangers in the 2020 Qualifying Round. In Game 2 of the series, Svechnikov scored a hat-trick during a 4–1 win. The feat was the first in Hurricanes/Hartford Whalers franchise postseason history.

On 26 August 2021, Svechnikov agreed to an eight-year, $62 million contract with the Hurricanes. On 11 March 2023, Svechnikov's 2022–23 season ended when he suffered a season-ending knee injury during a 4–0 loss to the Vegas Golden Knights. He appeared in 64 games, recording 23 goals and 32 assists for 55 points during the season.

Personal life
Svechnikov's older brother, Evgeny, was drafted by the Detroit Red Wings in the first round of the 2015 NHL Entry Draft. 

Svechnikov's father, Igor worked as a pediatrician on Sakhalin Island, but after the 1995 Neftegorsk earthquake gave up the practice and moved his family to Barnaul in Siberia, and sold cakes in the region. Svechnikov's mother, Elena, worked two jobs: reception at a hockey rink during the day, and cleaning floors at night. With Elena's connection to the hockey rink both of her sons took an early interest in hockey, and Svechnikov began skating when he was 3.

In order to help both of their sons develop in hockey, Igor and Elena moved to Moscow, though after one year they were recruited by Ak Bars Kazan, so the family moved to Kazan. When Svechnikov moved to Michigan to play in the USHL, Elena joined him, and with Evgeny playing nearby they would all frequently spend time together.

Career statistics

Regular season and playoffs

International

Awards and honours

References

External links
 

2000 births
Living people
Barrie Colts players
Carolina Hurricanes draft picks
Carolina Hurricanes players
Expatriate ice hockey players in Canada
Expatriate ice hockey players in the United States
Ice hockey players at the 2016 Winter Youth Olympics
Muskegon Lumberjacks players
National Hockey League first-round draft picks
Russian expatriate ice hockey people
Russian expatriate sportspeople in Canada
Russian expatriate sportspeople in the United States
Russian ice hockey right wingers
Sportspeople from Barnaul